Zarrinrud (Russian and Tajik: Зарринруд, formerly Qiziljar) is a village in Sughd Region, northern Tajikistan. It is part of the jamoat Amondara in the city of Panjakent.

References

Populated places in Sughd Region